Mary Mitchell Birchall (1840-1898) was the first woman in New England to earn a bachelor's degree when she graduated from Bates College in 1869. She later served as a professor at Vassar College and founded a girls' school in Boston.

Mary Wheelwright Mitchell was born in 1840 in Dover, Maine to John and Charlotte (Littlefield) Mitchell. She graduated from Bates in 1869 while working in a local textile mill to support herself, and she reportedly turned down a scholarship. After graduation, Mitchell taught high school in Worcester, Massachusetts, and Miss Anna Brackett's School in New York, before becoming a professor at Vassar College in 1876-77. In 1891 she founded a girls' school in West Chester Park in Boston, which she ran until 1897. Mitchell also taught school in Laconia New Hampshire. She married Frank Birchall and had two children. She died in 1898 in the town of her birth and was buried in the McAllister Cemetery.

References

1840 births
1898 deaths
Bates College alumni
People from Dover-Foxcroft, Maine
Vassar College faculty